Makhammetgeldi Annaamanov  (born 1959)   is  a Turkmen politician. He is the current Minister of Education of Turkmenistan.

Born in Ashgabat, he graduated from the Turkmen Institute of National Economy and gained a  master's degree in economic sciences. Since 2004 he has been rector of the Turkmen Institute of National Economy and Minister of Education since 2006.

References
New government of Turkmenistan

1959 births
Living people
Government ministers of Turkmenistan
Date of birth missing (living people)
People from Ashgabat